Crassispira harpularia is a species of sea snail, a marine gastropod mollusk in the family Pseudomelatomidae.

Description
The shell has a chestnut- or chocolate color. The spire is more slenderly elongated. The siphonal canal is 'longer and more compressed than in Clathrodrillia solida (C. B. Adams, 1850). The revolving lines do not form granules on the ribs.

Distribution
This marine species is endemic to Australia and occurs off South Australia, Tasmania, Victoria and Western Australia.

References

 Des Moulins, Act. Soc. Linn. Bordeaux, xii., 1842, p. 162. 
 Angas, G.F. 1865. On the marine molluscan fauna of the Province of South Australia, with a list of all the species known up to the present time, together with remarks on their habitats and distribution, etc. Proceedings of the Zoological Society of London 1865: 155-"180"
 Hedley, C. 1922. A revision of the Australian Turridae. Records of the Australian Museum 13(6): 213–359, pls 42–56 
 Ludbrook, N.H. 1978. Quaternary molluscs of the western part of the Eucla Basin. Bulletin of the Geological Survey of Western Australia 125: 1–286
 Wells, F.E. 1990. Revision of the recent Australian Turridae referred to the genera Splendrillia and Austrodrillia. Journal of the Malacological Society of Australasia 11: 73–117 
 Wilson, B. 1994. Australian Marine Shells. Prosobranch Gastropods. Kallaroo, WA : Odyssey Publishing Vol. 2 370 pp.

External links
 
  Systematisches Conchylien-Cabinet  Bd 4, Abt.3 p. 97

harpularia
Gastropods of Australia
Gastropods described in 1842